A water bird, alternatively waterbird or aquatic bird, is a bird that lives on or around water. In some definitions, the term water bird is especially applied to birds in freshwater ecosystems, although others make no distinction from seabirds that inhabit marine environments. Some water birds (e.g. wading birds) are more terrestrial while others (e.g. waterfowls) are more aquatic, and their adaptations will vary depending on their environment. These adaptations include webbed feet, beaks, and legs adapted to feed in the water, and the ability to dive from the surface or the air to catch prey in water.

The term aquatic bird is sometimes also used in this context. A related term that has a narrower meaning is waterfowl. Some piscivorous birds of prey, such as ospreys and sea eagles, hunt aquatic prey but do not stay in water for long and lives predominantly over dry land, and are not considered water birds. The term waterbird is also used in the context of conservation to refer to any birds that inhabit or depend on bodies of water or wetland areas. Examples of this use include the Agreement on the Conservation of African-Eurasian Migratory Waterbirds (AEWA) and the Wallnau Waterbird Reserve.

Types 
Some examples of water birds are:

Seabirds (marine birds, orders Suliformes, Sphenisciformes, Phaethontiformes, and Procellariiformes, family Pelecanidae within Pelecaniformes and families Alcidae, Laridae, and Stercorariidae within Charadriiformes)
Shorebirds (waders, order Charadriiformes)
Waterfowls (order Anseriformes, i.e. ducks, geese, swans, magpie geese, screamers)
Grebes (order Podicipediformes)
Loons (order Gaviiformes)
Storks (order Ciconiiformes)
Pelecaniformes (pelicans, herons, egrets, ibises, etc.)
Flamingos (order Phoenicopteriformes)
Some members of the order Gruiformes (including cranes and rails, crakes, coots and moorhens)
Kingfishers (mainly the water kingfishers, sometimes the river kingfishers, and rarely the tree kingfishers)
One family of passerines, the dippers

Evolution 

The evolution of waterbirds is often mainly centered around adaptations to improve feeding techniques. This includes legs that are adapted to diving or wading and webbing between the toes. Many of these adaptations are common between different types of waterbirds. For example, flamingos and ducks share a similar filter-feeding lifestyle, and the shoebill has a similar structure (morphology) to many wading birds. 

DNA sequence analysis, specifically the mitochondrial gene sequencing, has been used to classify and differentiate the various aquatic birds. This classification is found by a relative apparent synapomorphy analysis (RASA) which highlighted certain branches of genes that classified the domestic duck and fowl, for example, as an outgroup. Comparing and understanding these gene patterns allows scientists to classify aquatic birds.

Conservation 

Waterbird conservation efforts in the United States are advanced by numerous organizations, including the 700,000 member strong Ducks Unlimited.  Employing such methods as conservation easements and outright purchase, it uses federal and state habitat reimbursements, sponsorships, member fees, major gifts, donations, royalties, and advertisement to raise over $200 million a year. A minimum of 80 percent of that revenue goes directly toward habitat conservation.

Ducks Unlimited partners with a wide range of corporations, governments, other non-governmental organizations, landowners, and private citizens to restore and manage areas that have been degraded and to prevent further degradation of existing wetlands. DU is also active in working with others to recommend government policies that will influence wetlands and the environment.  Through March of 2021 Ducks Unlimited had conserved at least 15 million acres of waterfowl habitat in North America.

To promote the conservation of waterbirds in America, the United States Fish and Wildlife Service established the Waterbird Conservation for the Americas to facilitate this over such a large area. The purpose of this initiative is to promote international cooperation and partnership to preserve waterbird habitats, create long term sustainability plans, implement specific conservation plans for regions, and support legal action for waterbird conservation on the regional and national levels.

Extinction 

The loss of wetlands has impacted waterbirds and is driving their extinction in regions where wetlands are polluted. Specifically, in China, 33% of wetlands were lost between 1978 and 2008, which is the primary breeding ground for China’s waterbird species such as the Baer’s Pochard, which is now at risk for extinction. The Baer’s Pochard’s population has decreased to between 150 and 700 birds in recent years due to negative environmental impacts on their habitat as well as human activities such as hunting and fishing. 

This loss of wetlands is a result of various sources in China. The rise of urbanization and industries has resulted in pollution and waste in the water. In addition, reclamation projects for construction further threaten ruining the habitats of these birds. For example, the largest of these reclamation projects is the Oufei Project, which spans 8854 Hectares.

Interspecific competition 

Experimental evidence of competition has been difficult to obtain in highly mobile animals that cannot be meaningfully confined to plots of limited size. Many such animals are believed to compete with less mobile, resident taxa, but the supporting evidence has often remained circumstantial.

One example is the interaction between water birds and benthic feeding fish, or fish that feed at the lowest level of a body of water. Many migratory water birds use similar food resources on their breeding, molting, or overwintering grounds as do resident fish species. Studies, such as that done by Eadie and Keast in 1982, found an inverse relationship between the waterbird Goldeneye and benthic feeding fish across multiple lakes.

Diseases 
Outbreaks of diseases spread by waterbirds result from the transition of water-borne viruses to those wild birds. The spread can be caused by dead waterbirds in the vicinity of other organisms, or simply from waterbirds with the virus settling into more densely populated areas (whether by humans or other organisms).

Duck enteritis virus (DEV) 
Duck plague (DP), also called duck enteritis virus (DEV), presents the most important concern in mass waterfowl production. Free-ranging water birds are the most likely infectious carriers. While the overall epidemiology of DEV is unknown in western Europe, studies conducted in Poland agree with the high levels of transmission between free-ranging water birds.

DEV is an aetiological agent of DP, which represents one of the most acute and lethal diseases of waterbirds, and infection can spread easily between farmed and wild waterbirds. Over 48 species of birds, including those not considered waterbirds, are susceptible to infection by DEV, and the mortality rate of this disease can reach up to 100%, especially in young birds.

H5N1 
Avian influenza caused by infection with H5N1, a highly pathogenic avian influenza virus (HPAIV), has spread in poultry in more than 60 countries in Eurasia and Africa since 1996, when the first outbreak occurred at a goose farm in Guangdong province in China. H5N1 in wild birds have spread to Asia, Europe, and Africa, and it is possible for the H5N1 virus to be spread by migratory water birds to the west and south, as genetically closely related H5N1 viruses have been isolated in several countries since 2005. 

H5N1 HPAIV infections have become endemic in several countries and cause accidental transmissions to humans. H5N1 viruses are thus now recognized as one of the most likely candidates for the next pandemic.

References 

Birds by common name
Birds